The 1937–38 Toronto Maple Leafs season was Toronto's 21st season of operation in the National Hockey League (NHL). The Maple Leafs made another Stanley Cup Final appearance, losing to the Chicago Black Hawks.

Offseason

Regular season

Final standings

Record vs. opponents

Toronto would not win another division championship until the 1999-2000 Season.

Schedule and results

Playoffs
The Maple Leafs swept the Boston Bruins in their second round, best of five series.  In the finals, they lost to the Chicago Black Hawks in a best of five series 3–1.

Player statistics

Regular season
Scoring

Goaltending

Playoffs
Scoring

Goaltending

Awards and records

Transactions
September 23, 1937: Traded Hap Day to the New York Americans for cash
September 23, 1937: Traded Art Jackson to the Boston Bruins for cash and Future Considerations
October 13, 1937: Signed Free Agent Bill Thomson
October 17, 1937: Signed Free Agent Chuck Corrigan
October 17, 1937: Acquired Wally Stanowski from the New York Americans for Jack Shill
October 27, 1937: Signed Free Agent Pete Langelle

See also
1937–38 NHL season

References

External links
 

Toronto Maple Leafs seasons
Toronto
Toronto